Mawlaik Township  is a township in Mawlaik District in the Sagaing Division of Burma. The principal town is Mawlaik.

References

External links

Maplandia World Gazetteer - map showing the township boundary

 
Townships of Sagaing Region